The 1911 Miami Redskins football team was an American football team that represented Miami University as a member of the Ohio Athletic Conference (OAC) during the 1911 college football season. Led by coach Edwin Sweetland in his first and only year, Miami compiled a 2–4–2 record. The prior season's coach, Harold Iddings, replaced Sweetland as basketball coach at Kentucky. Sweetland  was the last head coach to leave Miami with a losing record until 1989 when Tim Rose's contract was not renewed.

Schedule

References

Miami
Miami RedHawks football seasons
Miami Redskins football